Halsfjorden is a fjord arm of Stokkafjorden in Vefsn municipality in Nordland. The fjord is 8 kilometres long to the village of Sørfjorden at the bottom of Sørfjorden.

Fjorden has its entrance between Skonsengodden to the south and Merra and Halsneset to the north. The fjord runs easterly. Grenda Husvik lies on the north of the fjord. From Husvik, Alsneset goes southwards of the fjord, and from there, the fjord splits in three. Halsan heads north, Grytåfjorden goes southeast, and Sørfjorden goes south. Sørfjorden is a few hundred metres longer than Halsan.

References

Fjords of Nordland